Mailasandra Hanumappa Manjunatha Reddy, known popularly as Thriller Manju, is an Indian stunt coordinator, filmmaker, actor known for his work in Kannada cinema. He has occasionally also served as screenwriter and choreographer. Apart from Kannada, Manju has also worked in a handful Telugu- and Tamil-language films. He ventured into film direction with the film, Police Story (1996).

Early life 
Manju was born in Mailasandra, a village in Bangalore, to C. Hanumappa Reddy and A. Rukminiamma. He had two siblings: older brother Gurumurthy and younger sister Padmavati. Hanumappa Reddy served as the chief of the village before the family moved to Bangalore city where he began working as an electrical contractor. The family resided in the Basavanagudi, where Manju was educated, at the Kamala Nehru Education Society. With a movie theatre and a martial arts training center in close proximity to his house, he was drawn towards both of these as a kid. He cited Rajkumar and Bruce Lee as his idols growing up.

Career
Manju began his career as a stuntman with Nyayada Kannu (1985). He played the stunt double of one of the characters in the film. Manju had one scene in the film and was shot in the Kanteerava Studios, Bangalore.

Manju's 2010 Kannada film, Jayahe featured himself in the leading roles alongside actors Ayesha and Jai Akash. The film was later dubbed and released in Malayalam as Lady Bruce Lee (2011) and into Tamil as Vettai Puli (2013).

Filmography
As director (Kannada)
Police Story  (1996)
Jackie Chan (1997)
Thriller Killer (1998)
One Man Army (1998)
Om Namah Shivaya (1999)
Hunter (2003)
Om Ganesh (2004)
Police Story 2 (2007)
Rajani (2009)
Jayahe (2010)
Police No. 1 (2011)
Police Story 3 (2011)

As actor
Thriller Killer (1998)
Amar Akbar Anthony (1998)
Naxalite (2000)
Narahantaka (2001) Supari (2001)Mafia (2001)Neethone Vuntanu (2001; Telugu)Police Officers (2002)Thrisakthi (2002)Hunter (2003)Bodyguard (2003)Rama Krishna (2004)Samudra (2004)Bhagath (2004)Police No. 1 (2011)CBI Sathya (2016)Raj Bahadur (2016)Dandu (2016)

As stunt coordinatorShhh (1993)Lockup Death (1994)Om (1995)Police Story (1996)Hunter (2003)Auto Shankar (2005)Veera Madakari (2009)Thittivasal (2017)Sarvasva (2017)

Awards and nominations
 1994-95: Karnataka State Film Award for Best Stunt Director (Special Award) - Lockup Death''
 2010: Innovative Film Award for Best Stunt Director

References

External links
 

Living people
Kannada film directors
Filmfare Awards South winners
Male actors from Bangalore
Indian male film actors
20th-century Indian male actors
1972 births
Indian action choreographers
Film directors from Bangalore
20th-century Indian film directors
21st-century Indian film directors
Martial artists from Karnataka